Yeast:
Yeast, eukaryotic, single-celled microorganisms
Baker's yeast
Yeast extract
Yeast (novel), aka Yeast: A Problem, a novel
Yeast (journal), a monthly journal
Yeast (wine)